The following article presents a summary of the 1962 football (soccer) season in Brazil, which was the 61st season of competitive football in the country.

Taça Brasil

Semifinals

Final

Santos declared as the Taça Brasil champions by aggregate score of 9–6.

Torneio Rio-São Paulo

Final Stage

Botafogo declared as the Torneio Rio-São Paulo champions.

State championship champions

Other competition champions

Brazilian clubs in international competitions

Brazil national team
The following table lists all the games played by the Brazil national football team in official competitions and friendly matches during 1962.

References

 Brazilian competitions at RSSSF
 1962 Brazil national team matches at RSSSF

 
Seasons in Brazilian football
Brazil